The New York Intellectuals: The Rise and Decline of the Anti-Stalinist Left from the 1930s to the 1980s is a 1987 history book about the New York Intellectuals by Alan M. Wald.

References

External links 

 

1987 non-fiction books
English-language books
History of New York City
Intellectual history
History books about the United States
American history books
University of North Carolina Press books